Zaspa is one of the quarters of Gdańsk, Poland, located in the northern part of the city. It is divided into two administrative districts: Zaspa-Młyniec and Zaspa-Rozstaje.

Zaspa was founded on a place previously occupied by an airport. The concrete airstrip of the airport was not dismantled, and now forms the axis of the district.

Zaspa buildings are mainly high-rise condominiums (between 4 and 12 stories high) erected in the early 1980s and additional thermal isolation in the form of styrofoam sheets was applied in the early 2000s. In the following years the buildings were also painted in pastel colours.

History

As part of the Crown of the Kingdom of Poland it was a private church village of the Cistercian Monastery in Oliwa, administratively located in the Gdańsk County in the Pomeranian Voivodeship.

During World War II, on October 5, 1939, the Germans carried out an execution of 39 Poles, defenders of the Polish Post Office in Gdansk, in the district. There are memorials to the defenders at the site of the execution and at the site of their former mass grave, which was discovered in 1991. The defenders were then officially buried at the cemetery of victims of Nazi Germany in Zaspa in 1992.

During the Solidarity times, Lech Wałęsa had an apartment on Zaspa. The pope John Paul II visited the district on 12 June 1987 during his third pilgrimage to Poland.

Sights
The Park Zaspa is one of the largest public parks in Gdańsk, and the large cemetery of victims of Nazi Germany is also located in Zaspa.

Transport
The Gdańsk Zaspa railway station is located in Zaspa.

Religion
Catholic churches of Saint Casimir and of Divine Providence are located in Zaspa.

Gallery

References

External links
 Map of Zaspa-Młyniec
 Map of Zaspa-Rozstaje

Districts of Gdańsk